The United States Senate election in New Hampshire was held on November 4, 2008. Incumbent Republican U.S. Senator John E. Sununu ran for re-election to a second term, but was defeated by Democrat Jeanne Shaheen in a rematch of the 2002 election. Shaheen's win marked the first time since 1972 that Democrats won this seat, and made her the first Democratic Senator elected from New Hampshire since John A. Durkin's victory in 1974.

Background 
For a considerable amount of time, New Hampshire had always been considered an island of conservatism in the Northeast. Following the 2006 election, however, many offices were taken over by Democrats: Representatives Carol Shea-Porter and Paul Hodes,  Governor John Lynch, the majority of the New Hampshire Executive Council, and the majority of both legislative chambers (which had not occurred since 1911). The popularity of Governor Lynch was considered an impediment to Sununu's re-election. Though the state voted for then-Gov. George W. Bush in 2000, Sen. John Kerry narrowly won the state over Bush in 2004.

Democratic primary

Candidates 
 Jeanne Shaheen, former governor
 Raymond Stebbins, attorney

Campaign 

Astronaut Jay Buckey MD, Portsmouth Mayor Steve Marchand, and Katrina Swett, (wife of former Congressman Richard Swett), had announced their candidacies but withdrew in favor of former governor Jeanne Shaheen upon her entrance into the race.

Shaheen had been the Democratic nominee for the race in 2002.  Since 2005, Shaheen had served as director of the Institute of Politics at Harvard Kennedy School before leaving on September 14, 2007. She had been aggressively courted to run by Senator Ted Kennedy (D-MA) on behalf of Senate Democrats, and by a "Draft Shaheen" campaign led by former New Hampshire Democratic Chairman Kathy Sullivan.

The filing deadline for the Democratic and Republican Parties was June 13, 2008. Shaheen filed, as did Raymond Stebbins.

Results

Republican primary

Candidates 
 Tom Alciere, former state representative
 John E. Sununu, incumbent U.S. Senator

Results

General election

Candidates 
 Ken Blevens (L)
 Jeanne Shaheen (D), former governor
 John E. Sununu (R), incumbent U.S. Senator

Campaign 
A November 2006 SurveyUSA poll of New Hampshire voters found Sununu had a 47% approval rating. A February 1, 2007 poll conducted by the University of New Hampshire found that only 45% of New Hampshire voters held a favorable opinion of Sununu. In June 2007, a poll by 7NEWS and Suffolk University of likely voters reported that only 31 percent in the poll said Sununu deserved re-election, with 47 percent saying that someone else should get his seat.

A July 2008 Granite State Poll had Sununu's favorability rating at 52%, his unfavorability rating at 33%, and neutral or undecided by 16%. Shaheen is viewed favorable by 53%, unfavorable by 31% and neutral or undecided by 15%.

Senator John McCain, the Republican nominee for president, had mentioned Sununu as a possible running mate for the 2008 presidential election, as well as Lindsey Graham, Bob Riley, Steve Forbes and John Thune. Sununu had said he would remain neutral in the New Hampshire primary. However, McCain selected Alaska governor Sarah Palin instead.

Predictions

Polling

Fundraising

Results

See also 
 2008 United States Senate elections

References

External links 
 Election Division from the New Hampshire Secretary of State
 U.S. Congress candidates for New Hampshire at Project Vote Smart
 New Hampshire, U.S. Senate CQ Politics
 New Hampshire U.S. Senate from OurCampaigns.com
 New Hampshire U.S. Senate race from 2008 Race Tracker
 Campaign contributions from OpenSecrets
 Sununu (R-i) vs Shaheen (D) graph of multiple polls from Pollster.com
 Official campaign websites
 John Sununu, Republican nominee
 Jay Buckey, withdrawn
 Jeanne Shaheen, Democratic nominee
 anti-Sununu website from the Democratic Senatorial Campaign Committee
 anti-Shaheen website from the National Republican Senatorial Committee

2008
New Hampshire
United States Senate